Tano South is one of the constituencies represented in the Parliament of Ghana. It elects one Member of Parliament (MP) by the first past the post system of electionYeboah Sekyere Benjamin is the member of parliament for the constituency. He was elected on the ticket of the New Patriotic Party (NPP) won a majority of 3803 votes to become the MP.

See also
List of Ghana Parliament constituencies

References 

Parliamentary constituencies in Ahafo Region